Idamay is a census-designated place (CDP) in Marion County, West Virginia, United States. Idamay has a post office with ZIP code 26576. As of the 2010 census, its population was 611.

History
The community was named after Ida May Watson, the daughter of Consolidation Coal co-founder James Otis Watson and sister of Caroline Watson Fleming, wife of West Virginia Governor Aretas Fleming.

Consolidation Coal began construction on their #87 Idamay mine and barracks in 1915. As the mine thrived, ‘company houses’ sprung up either built on sight by the carpenter’s crew or transported from closed mines in Pennsylvania. The mine was fully operational by 1917 bringing the railroad, teams of migrant workers, and an established, fully self-sustaining town. Miners and their families were supplied with a recreation hall, company store, first class school, community gardens, concerts, and picnics. Company nurses and doctors were always on call, and the street car system supplied an easy means to the cities of Fairmont and Mannington. Throughout the 1920s and 30s, Ida May was most notable for her championship miner’s league team, the “Ida Mae Fence Busters.” Both mine league teams and professional baseball teams from across the country traveled for an attempt to usurp the champions, most failed.

In the early 1950s, Bethlehem Coal bought the mine renaming her the Bethlehem #44, for which she is most well-known today. Under Bethlehem, the Idamay mine was among the first to successfully utilize a roofing bolt system making her a working model for new mines. As unionization took hold and mine scrip dissolved, Bethlehem started selling company houses to miners. In order to maintain the communal way of life, the Idamay Improvement Association was founded in 1953 establishing by-laws for the development, general maintenance, and future of the town. When Bethlehem closed the mine in 1971, much of the remaining properties were deeded to the Association. The Idamay Improvement Association continues to oversee the town today.

Gallery

See also

 List of census-designated places in West Virginia

References

External links

Census-designated places in Marion County, West Virginia
Census-designated places in West Virginia
Coal towns in West Virginia